Mahishadal is a community development block that forms an administrative division in Haldia subdivision of Purba Medinipur district in the Indian state of West Bengal.

Geography
Purba Medinipur district is part of the lower Indo-Gangetic Plain and Eastern coastal plains. Topographically, the district can be divided into two parts – (a) almost entirely flat plains on the west, east and north, (b) the coastal plains on the south. The vast expanse of land is formed of alluvium and is composed of younger and coastal alluvial. The elevation of the district is within 10 metres above mean sea level. The district has a long coastline of 65.5 km along its southern and south eastern boundary. Five coastal CD Blocks, namely, Khejuri II, Contai II (Deshapran), Contai I, Ramnagar I and II, are occasionally affected by cyclones and tornadoes. Tidal floods are quite regular in these five CD Blocks. Normally floods occur in 21 of the 25 CD Blocks in the district. The major rivers are Haldi, Rupnarayan, Rasulpur, Bagui and Keleghai, flowing in north to south or south-east direction. River water is an important source of irrigation. The district has a low 899 hectare forest cover, which is 0.02% of its geographical area.

Mahishadal CD Block is bounded by Shyampur I CD Block, in Howrah district, across the Rupnarayan  in the north, Sutahata CD Block in the east, Haldia, Nandigram II and Chandipur CD Blocks in the south and Nandakumar CD Blocks in the west.

It is located 16 km from Tamluk, the district headquarters.

Mahishadal CD Block has an area of 146.48 km2. It has 1 panchayat samity, 11 gram panchayats, 154 gram sansads (village councils), 75 mouzas and 73 inhabited villages. Mahishadal police station serves this block. Headquarters of this CD Block is at Rangibasan.

Gram panchayats of Mahishadal block/ panchayat samiti are: Amritberia, Betkundu, Garhkamalpur, Itamogra I, Itamogra II, Kismat-Naikundi, Lakshya I, Lakshya II, Natshal I, Natshal II and Satish Samanta.

Demographics

Population
As per 2011 Census of India Mahishadal CD Block had a total population of 206,277, of which 199,613 were rural and 6,664 were urban. There were 106,391 (52%) males and 99,886 (48%) females. Population below 6 years was 23,598. Scheduled Castes numbered 23,201 (11.25%)  and Scheduled Tribes numbered 193 (0.09%).

As per 2001 census, Mahishadal block had a total population of 182,245, out of which 93,470 were males and 88,775 were females. Mahishadal block registered a population growth of 14.89 per cent during the 1991-2001 decade. Decadal growth for the combined Midnapore district was 14.87 per cent. Decadal growth in West Bengal was 17.84 per cent.

Census Town in Mahishadal CD Block (2011 census figure in brackets: Garh Kamalpur (6,664).

Large villages (with 4,000+ population) in Mahishadal CD Block (2011 census figures in brackets): Gopalpur (8,294), Basulya (4,599), Itamagra (4,032), Rajarampur (4,078), Keshabpur Jalpai (8,955), Kanchanpur (5,597), Chanpi (5,237), Kalika Kundu (6,421), Rambagh (4,208), Purba Srirampur (5,024), Natshal (11,331), Laksya (8,247), Betkundu (4,935) and Mayachar or Bardyabiri Char (4,361).

Other villages in Mahishadal CD Block (2011 census figures in brackets): Rangibasan (2,570), Kismatnai Kundi (2,686) and Amritberya (3,958).

Literacy
As per 2011 census the total number of literates in Mahisadal CD Block was 157,494 (86.21% of the population over 6 years) out of which 86,027 (55%) were males and 71,467 (45%) were females.

As per 2011 census, literacy in Purba Medinipur district was 87.02%. Purba Medinipur had the highest literacy amongst all the districts of West Bengal in 2011. Literacy in West Bengal was 77.08% in 2011. Literacy in India in 2011 was 74.04%.

See also – List of West Bengal districts ranked by literacy rate

Language and religion
As per the 2001 census, Bengali was the mother-tongue of 90.5% of the population of Purba Medinipur district, followed by Santali (4.6%), Hindi (1.4%), Kurmali Thar (0.7%), Urdu (0.6%), Telugu (0.6%), Odiya (0.4%), Mundari (0.2%), Koda/ Kora (0.1%), Munda (0.1%), Nepali (0.1%) and others (0.3%). Census information about language is available at the district level or above only.

The West Bengal Official Language (Second Amendment) Bill, 2012, included Hindi, Santhali, Odiya and Punjabi as official languages  if it is spoken by a population exceeding 10 per cent of the whole in a particular block or sub-division or a district.  Subsequently, Kamtapuri, Rajbanshi and Kurmali were also included in the list of minority languages by the West Bengal Official Language (Second Amendment) Bill, 2018. However, as of 2019, there is no official / other reliable information about the areas covered.

In 2011 census Hindus numbered 164,943 and formed 79.96% of the population in Mahishadal CD Block. Muslims numbered 40,596 and formed 19.68% of the population. Others numbered 738 and formed 0.36% of the population.

Rural poverty
The District Human Development Report for Purba Medinipur has provided a CD Block-wise data table for Modified Human Poverty Index of the district. Mahishadal CD Block registered 26.35 on the MHPI scale. The CD Block-wise mean MHPI was estimated at 24.78. Eleven out of twentyfive CD Blocks were found to be severely deprived in respect of grand CD Block average value of MHPI (CD Blocks with lower amount of poverty are better):  All the CD Blocks of Haldia and Contai subdivisions appeared backward, except Ramnagar I & II, of all the blocks of Egra subdivision only Bhagabanpur I appeared backward and in Tamluk subdivision none appeared backward.

Economy

Livelihood
In Mahishadal CD Block in 2011, total workers formed 35.88% of the total population and amongst the class of total workers, cultivators formed 11.27%, agricultural labourers 34.96%, household industry workers 5.04% and other workers 49.00%.

Infrastructure
There are 73 inhabited villages in Mahishadal CD block. All 73 villages (100%) have power supply. 72 villages (98.63%) have drinking water supply. 27 villages (36.99%) have post offices. 62 villages (84.93%) have telephones (including landlines, public call offices and mobile phones). 29 villages (39.73%) have a pucca (paved) approach road and 34 villages (46.58%) have transport communication (includes bus service, rail facility and navigable waterways). 14 villages (19.18%) have agricultural credit societies. 17 villages (23.29%) have banks.

In 2007-08, around 40% of rural households in the district had electricity.
 
In 2013-14, there were 38 fertiliser depots, 8 seed stores and 32 fair price shops in the CD Block.

Agriculture

According to the District Human Development Report of Purba Medinipur: The agricultural sector is the lifeline of a predominantly rural economy. It is largely dependent on the Low Capacity Deep Tubewells (around 50%) or High Capacity Deep Tubewells (around 27%) for irrigation, as the district does not have a good network of canals, compared to some of the neighbouring districts. In many cases the canals are drainage canals which get the backflow of river water at times of high tide or the rainy season. The average size of land holding in Purba Medinipur, in 2005-06, was 0.73 hectares against 1.01 hectares in West Bengal.

Although the Bargadari Act of 1950 recognised the rights of bargadars to a higher share of crops from the land that they tilled, it was not implemented fully. Large tracts, beyond the prescribed limit of land ceiling, remained with the rich landlords. From 1977 onwards major land reforms took place in West Bengal. Land in excess of land ceiling was acquired and distributed amongst the peasants. Following land reforms land ownership pattern has undergone transformation. In 2013-14, persons engaged in agriculture in Mahishadal CD Block could be classified as follows: bargadars 6.91%, patta (document) holders 13.10%, small farmers (possessing land between 1 and 2 hectares) 2.52%, marginal farmers (possessing land up to 1 hectare) 33.75% and agricultural labourers 43.71%.

In 2013-14, Mahishadal CD Block produced 12,670 tonnes of Aman paddy, the main winter crop, from 9,894 hectares, 23,856 tonnes of Boro paddy, the spring crop, from 6,356 hectares, 307 tonnes of Aus paddy, the summer crop, from 150 hectares, 27 tonnes of jute from 2 hectares and 518 tonnes of potatoes from 19 hectares. It also produced pulses and oil seeds.

Betelvine is a major source of livelihood in Purba Medinipur district, particularly in Tamluk and Contai subdivisions. Betelvine production in 2008-09 was the highest amongst all the districts and was around a third of the total state production. In 2008-09, Purba Mednipur produced 2,789 tonnes of cashew nuts from 3,340 hectares of land.

Pisciculture
Purba Medinipur's net district domestic product derives one fifth of its earnings from fisheries, the highest amongst all the districts of West Bengal. The net area available for effective pisciculture in Mahishadal CD Block in 2013-14 was 870.00 hectares. 4,458 persons were engaged in the profession and approximate annual production was 33,147 quintals.

Banking
In 2013-14, Mahishadal CD Block had offices of 3 commercial banks and 3 gramin banks.

Backward Regions Grant Fund
Medinipur East district is listed as a backward region and receives financial support from the Backward Regions Grant Fund.  The fund, created by the Government of India, is designed to redress regional imbalances in development. As of 2012, 272 districts across the country were listed under this scheme. The list includes 11 districts of West Bengal.

Transport

Mahishadal railway station and Satish Samanta Halt railway station is situated on the Panskura-Haldia line. The line was constructed in 1968 and was electrified in 1974-76.

NH 116, from Kolaghat to Haldia, passes through this block.
Haldia to Mecheda state highway also passes through the block.

Tourism
Mahishadal and Geonkhali are tourist destinations.

Education
In 2013-14, Mahishadal CD Block had 128 primary schools with 9,625 students, 8 middle schools with 463 students, 13 high schools with 9,654 students and 17 higher secondary schools with 16,670 students. Mahishadal CD Block had 2 general colleges with 4,923 students and 304 institutions for special and non-formal education with 11,196 students.

As per the 2011 census, in Mahishadal CD block, amongst the 73 inhabited villages, 2 villages did not have a school, 49 villages had two or more  primary schools, 38 villages had at least 1 primary and 1 middle school and 24 villages had at least 1 middle and 1 secondary school.

Mahishadal Raj College at Mahishadal was established in 1946. In addition to courses in arts, science and commerce, it offers post-graduate courses in Bengali and chemistry.

Mahishadal Girls College at Mahishadal was established in 1969. It offers courses in arts and science.

Healthcare
In 2014, Mahishadal CD Block had 1 block primary health centre, 1 primary health centre, and 3 private nursing homes with total 80 beds and 8 doctors (excluding private bodies). It had 30 family welfare sub centres. 4,331 patients were treated indoor and 109,019 patients were treated outdoor in the hospitals, health centres and subcentres of the CD Block.

Basulia Rural Hospital at Basulia (with 30 beds) is the main medical facility in Mahishadal CD block. There are primary health centres at Natsal, PO Geonkhali (with 10 beds) and Rajarampur, PO Geonkhali (with ? beds).

External links
 - includes Mahishadal

References

Community development blocks in Purba Medinipur district